Sayyid Husayn Ahlati or Akhlāṭī (died 1397) was a Persianate Kurdish Muslim occultist, lettrist and personal physician-alchemist to Sultan Barquq who played a pivotal role in the intellectual network which developed a renaissance of occultism in Islam in the late 14th century. Ahlati is also accredited as the author of the geomantic manual Risāla-yi Surḫāb.

Life 
Ahlati was a occulist from Ahlat or Tabriz who moved to Mamluk Cairo because of the growing Occulist studies there. Becoming an important figure in the growing studies, he became a worry for anti-occulists like Ibn Khaldun and Ibn al-Qayyim who sharpened their criticism on Ahlati but failed to convince Barquq.

Disciples and students of Ahlati include ibn Turk, Ḥasan Abarqūhī, al-Ḥāǧǧ Ḥasan, Sharaf al-Din Ali Yazdi, Shams al-Din al-Fanari and Šayḫ Badr al-Dīn al-Simāwī. He moreover influenced Jalal al-Din Davani and Mir Damad.

References 

1397 deaths
Year of birth unknown
14th-century Kurdish people
14th-century Persian-language writers
People from Tabriz
Muslim occultists
Scholars from the Mamluk Sultanate
People from Ahlat